The Toshiko Trio (a.k.a. George Wein Presents Toshiko) is a jazz record album recorded in 1956 in New York City and released on the Storyville record label.  It is the second studio recording of pianist Toshiko Akiyoshi - not to be confused with her 1983 Toshiba East World album, Toshiko Akiyoshi Trio.

Track listing
All compositions by Toshiko Akiyoshi except as noted:
LP side A
"Between Me and Myself" – 5:15
"It Could Happen to You" (Burke, Van Heusen) – 3:55
"Kyōshū" ("Nostalgia") – 3:39
"Homework" – 3:38
LP side B
"Manhattan Address" – 2:43
"Sunday Afternoon" – 4:15
"Blues for Toshiko" – 5:10
"Soshū No Yoru" (traditional) – 1:35
"Softly, as in a Morning Sunrise" (Hammerstein, Romberg) – 4:05

Personnel
Toshiko Akiyoshi – piano
Paul Chambers – bass
Ed Thigpen – drums

References

Storyville STLP-912

1956 albums
Toshiko Akiyoshi albums
Storyville Records (George Wein's) albums